Białkowski (feminine: Białkowska; plural: Białkowscy) is a Polish surname. Its Russified form is Belkovsky/Belkovski.

The surname may refer to:
 Bartosz Białkowski (born 1987), Polish footballer
 Dariusz Białkowski (born 1970), Polish sprint canoeist
 Eliza Białkowska (born 1973), Polish rhythmic gymnast
 Ewa Białkowska (born 1959), Polish speed skater
 Aneta Michalak-Białkowska (born 1977), Polish sprint canoeist

See also
 
 

Polish-language surnames